A World Transformed is a 1998 book by former U.S. President George H. W. Bush and Brent Scowcroft, Bush's national security advisor, documenting foreign relations during the Bush administration.

They explained in 1998 why they failed to go to Baghdad and remove Saddam Hussein's government from power in 1991 during the Gulf War:

Notes

Further reading
 
 Sparrow, Bartholomew H. "Realism's Practitioner: Brent Scowcroft and the Making of the New World Order, 1989–1993." Diplomatic History 34.1 (2010): 141–175. online
 Sparrow, Bartholomew. The Strategist: Brent Scowcroft and the Call of National Security (2015).

External links
Booknotes interview with Bush and Scowcroft on A World Transformed, October 4, 1998.

1998 non-fiction books
Political books
Books by George H. W. Bush
Alfred A. Knopf books
Books about George H. W. Bush
Gulf War books
Books written by presidents of the United States